Nick Kenny (born 13 July 1982) is an Australian former professional rugby league footballer who played in the 2000s and 2010s for the Brisbane Broncos club in the National Rugby League competition. He primarily played as a prop-forward.

Early life
Kenny was born in Rockhampton, Queensland.  Kenny attended proud rugby league school Emmaus College prior to residing at St Leo's College from 2000-2002. His junior rugby league club was Norths Rockhampton Knights.

Playing career
Kenny made his first grade debut for Brisbane in Round 17 2005 against Cronulla-Sutherland.  In 2006, Kenny only featured in 1 game and was not part of the premiership winning team.  In 2009, Kenny played in Brisbane's 40-10 preliminary final loss against Melbourne.

In late 2011, Kenny retired from rugby league to focus on his physiotherapy career.

References

External links
2011 Brisbane Broncos profile

NRL profile
Redcliffe Dolphins profile

1982 births
Living people
Australian rugby league players
Brisbane Broncos players
Rugby league props
Rugby league players from Rockhampton, Queensland